Mariana Beatriz López Crespo is a Puerto Rican footballer who plays as a forward. She has been a member of the Puerto Rico women's national team .

International career
López represented Puerto Rico at the 2015 CONCACAF Women's U-20 Championship qualification. At senior level, she capped during the 2018 CONCACAF Women's Championship qualification.

International goals
Scores and results list Puerto Rico's goal tally first

References 

Living people
Women's association football forwards
Puerto Rican women's footballers
Puerto Rico women's international footballers
Puerto Rican expatriate women's footballers
Puerto Rican expatriates in Costa Rica
Expatriate footballers in Costa Rica
Year of birth missing (living people)